Hans Nunoo Sarpei (born 22 August 1998) is a Ghanaian professional footballer who plays as a midfielder for 2. Bundesliga club FC Ingolstadt.

Career
In August 2016 Sarpei moved to VfB Stuttgart. He made his professional debut for Stuttgart on 25 October 2016 in the 2016–17 DFB-Pokal against Borussia Mönchengladbach.

On 5 September 2017, Sarpei was loaned out to FK Senica until the end of the season.

On 6 October 2018, Sarpei made for VfB Stuttgart his Bundesliga debut against Hannover 96.

In January 2019, Sarpei joined 2. Bundesliga side SpVgg Greuther Fürth on a half-season loan with Greuther Fürth securing an option to sign him permanently.

On 1 January 2022, Sarpei transferred to 2. Bundesliga side FC Ingolstadt.

Personal life
Sarpei is the nephew of former Ghanaian footballer Hans Sarpei.

Career statistics

Clubs

References

1998 births
Living people
Footballers from Accra
Ghanaian footballers
Association football midfielders
VfB Stuttgart players
FK Senica players
SpVgg Greuther Fürth players
FC Ingolstadt 04 players
Bundesliga players
2. Bundesliga players
Slovak Super Liga players
Ghanaian expatriate sportspeople in Germany
Expatriate footballers in Germany
Ghanaian expatriate sportspeople in Slovakia
Expatriate footballers in Slovakia
Ghanaian expatriate footballers